Ciarán Sheehan is an Irish-born actor who has appeared in several Off-Broadway and Broadway theatre productions, including Les Misérables, playing both Babet and Marius, and Phantom of the Opera, where he has played both Raoul and the title character.  He has worked with the Irish Repertory Theatre as an actor appearing in Frank McCourt's The Irish… and How They Got That Way, The Hostage, Camelot, and Finian's Rainbow. As a producer he was the lead producer of the musical The Molly Maguires directed by Sheryl Kaller. 

His work as Billy in the Boston production of Carousel gained him multiple best actor nominations, and his work as Wolfe Tone in Peter Danish's The Final Days of Wolfe Tone in Nashville, Tennessee also received multiple best actor nominations. In film, he has won a best actor award from the NY International Film Festival for his role in The Waiting Room. He is due to be seen in the Deborah Markowitz film The Only Woman In The World'' in March 2022 when it makes its world premiere.

Currently he is touring internationally with the group The Four Phantoms In Concert.

References

External links 
Artist Bio at Broadway Nights

Irish male musical theatre actors
Living people
Year of birth missing (living people)